Antonio Hama Thai is an official in the Mozambican military. He has held various positions in the Mozambican government, including chief of the air force and minister for Veteran's Affairs. He speaks Ndau, Shona, Russian, Portuguese, and English.

References

External links
 Frelimo Denies Plan to 'Finish Off' Renamo 

Year of birth missing (living people)
Living people
Mozambican military personnel
Place of birth missing (living people)